Philip Schwyzer (born 19 April 1970) is an American-British literary scholar and author, who since 2001 has been Professor of Renaissance Literature at Exeter University.

Family background
Schwyzer was born in Santa Barbara, California. His father was Hubert Schwyzer (1935–2006), a professor of philosophy at the University of California, Santa Barbara, who was born in Austria, taken to England as a child when his parents, a Vienna-based Jewish physician father and half-Jewish mother, fled after the Anschluss, and later emigrated to California. His mother, Alison Schwyzer, taught philosophy at Monterey Peninsula College. His parents divorced when he was young, and, with his elder brother, he was raised by his mother in Carmel, California. His brother, Hugo, is an author, blogger, and former academic at Pasadena City College.

Career
Schwyzer received his undergraduate and doctoral degrees from the University of California, Berkeley. He also holds an MPhil from Lincoln College, Oxford.

His book Archaeologies of English Renaissance Literature, explored images of exhumation and excavation texts including Shakespeare's Romeo and Juliet and Hamlet, Spenser's Faerie Queene, John Donne's sermons and Thomas Browne's Hydriotaphia. Further publications include Literature, Nationalism and Memory in Early Modern England and Wales (2004).

His book Shakespeare and the Remains of Richard III (2013) looks at Shakespeare's play Richard III and the remains of the king recently discovered in Leicester. Schwyzer predicted that the discovery might lead to a "backlash" against Shakespeare, but also more interest in his play. Regarding the controversy over where the bones should be reburied, Schwyzer said, "Experience shows that burying Richard III has never been a very effective way of getting him to rest in peace."

He has co-authored sister guides to the Norton Anthology of English Literature and has contributed biographies to the Dictionary of National Biography including Arthur Kelton and Thomas Phaer (Phayer). Books that he has co-edited include Archipelagic Identities: Literature and Identity in the Early Modern Atlantic Archipelago (with Simon Mealor) Ashgate, 2004. In 2010, he collaborated with Willy Maley in the anthology Shakespeare and Wales.

References

External links
Philip Schwyzer at University of Exeter

American expatriate academics
Living people
1970 births
American literary historians
Academics of the University of Exeter
Alumni of Lincoln College, Oxford
American male non-fiction writers
American people of Austrian descent
American people of Austrian-Jewish descent
People from Carmel-by-the-Sea, California
Historians from California